This is the discography of Philippines recording artist Daniel Padilla, produced by  Rox. Santos and managed by Star Records. He has released three studio albums, one extended play, and one compilation album. He also contributed in a total of nine guest singles and seven soundtracks.

His debut album DJP won Best Selling Album of the Year in Awit Awards for two consecutive years in 2013 & 2014 with 40,00 copies sold, hence making it the highest-selling album of his career. His mini album Daniel Padilla, second studio album I Heart You; certified double platinum by PARI, while his third studio album I Feel Good certified gold. In December 2016 Padilla released his first compilation album, DJ Greatest Hits.

Studio albums

Extended plays

Compilation albums

Duet/collaborative albums

Singles

Soundtrack contribution

Guest appearances

Promotional singles

References

Discography
Padilla,Daniel